Obas may refer to:

People
 Beethova Obas (born 1964), Haitian musician
 Charles Obas, Haitian painter

Places
 Obas District, Peru

Other
 OBAs, Optical Brighteing Agents